List of cattle breeds — Over 1000 breeds of cattle are recognized worldwide, some of which adapted to the local climate, others which were bred by humans for specialized uses.

Cattle breeds fall into two main types, which are regarded as either two closely related species, or two subspecies of one species.  Bos indicus (or Bos taurus indicus) cattle, commonly called zebu, are adapted to hot climates and originated in the tropical parts of the world such as India, Sub-saharan Africa, China, and Southeast Asia.  Bos taurus (or Bos taurus taurus), typically referred to as "taurine" cattle, are generally adapted to cooler climates and include almost all cattle breeds originating from Europe and northern Asia.

In some parts of the world further species of cattle are found (both as wild and domesticated animals), and some of these are related so closely to taurine and indicus cattle that interspecies hybrids have been bred.  Examples include the Dwarf Lulu cattle of the mountains of Nepal with yak blood, the Beefalo of North America with bison genes, the Selembu breed of India and Bhutan with gayal genes. The Madura breed of Indonesia may have banteng in its parentage.  In addition to these fertile hybrids, there are sterile hybrids such as the male Dzo of Nepal, a cattle-yak hybrid which is bred for agricultural work - like the mule and the hinny, they have to be continually bred from both of the parent species.

A

B

C

D

E

F

G

H

I

J

K

L

M

N

O

P

Q

R

S

T

U

V

W

X

Y

Z

See also

 List of dairy cattle breeds
 List of beef cattle breeds
 Lists of domestic animal breeds

Notes

References

External links 

 Breeds of Cattle – Oklahoma State University
 Breeds of Cattle – Cattle.com
 Breeds of Cattle – Cow World (archived 19 January 2017)
 Cattle Breeds – Embryoplus.com (archived 29 November 2013)
 Breeds of Cattle – Official 2nd Edition
 Cattle Breeds of the World
 Portuguese Cattle Breeds (archived 17 January 2016)
 EuReCa – Towards self-sustainable EUropean, REgional CAttle breeds
 Native cow varieties of India

 
Cattle